Songyuan may refer to several things in China:

Songyuan, a city in Jilin Province
Songyuan, Zhejiang
Songyuan, Fujian
Songyuan, Guangdong
Songyuan River, in Guangdong Province

Also:
23686 Songyuan, a Main-belt Asteroid